The Nigerian National Assembly delegation from Edo comprises three Senators representing Edo Central, Edo South, and Edo North, and nine  Representatives representing  Egor/Ikpoba-okha, Owan West/East, Esan North-East/Esan South- East, Esan Central/West/Igueben, Ovia South/West-Ovia North/East, Akoko-Edo, Etsako East/West/Central, Orhionmwon/Uhunmwode, and Oredo.

Fourth Republic

The 8th Assembly (2015 - 2019)

The 5th Assembly (2003 - 2007)

References
Official Website - National Assembly House of Representatives (Edo State)
 Senator List

Politics of Edo State
National Assembly (Nigeria) delegations by state